Estonia competed at the 1992 Summer Olympics in Barcelona, Spain. It was the first Olympiad after the breakup of the Soviet Union.  Estonia was one of three ex-Soviet republics to compete individually, with Latvia and Lithuania being the other two, instead of competing on the Unified Team. 37 competitors, 33 men and 4 women, took part in 35 events in 13 sports.

Medalists

Competitors
The following is the list of number of competitors in the Games.

Archery

Estonia sent one man to its first independent Olympic archery competition.  He did not qualify for the elimination rounds.

Men

Athletics

Men
Field events

Combined events – Men's decathlon

Women
Track & road events

Combined events – Heptathlon

Canoeing

Sprint
Men

Cycling

Three cyclists, two men and one woman, represented Estonia in 1992. Erika Salumäe won gold in the women's sprint.

Road

Track
Sprint

Fencing

Two male fencers represented Estonia in 1992.
Men

Individual

Judo

Men

Modern pentathlon

One male pentathlete represented Estonia in 1992.

Rowing

Men

Sailing

Men

Women

Shooting

Women

Open

Swimming

Men

Table tennis

Wrestling

Men's freestyle

Men's Greco-Roman

Remarks

References

External links
 EOK – Barcelona 1992 
 

Nations at the 1992 Summer Olympics
1992
1992 in Estonian sport